Rock Camp is an unincorporated community in northeastern Perry Township, Lawrence County, Ohio, United States.

References

Unincorporated communities in Lawrence County, Ohio
Unincorporated communities in Ohio